The 2021 Gibraltar Open (officially the 2021 BetVictor Gibraltar Open) was a professional snooker tournament that took place from 1 to 7 March 2021 at the Marshall Arena in Milton Keynes, England. It was the twelfth ranking event of the 2020–21 snooker season, and the sixth and final event in the BetVictor European Series.

The event was the sixth instalment of the Gibraltar Open tournament, first held in 2015. It was organised by the World Professional Billiards and Snooker Association and sponsored by BetVictor. The defending champion was Judd Trump, who defeated Kyren Wilson 4–3 in the 2020 final. Trump retained his title, defeating Jack Lisowski 4–0 in the final and losing just three of the 31 frames he played in the tournament overall. It was Trump's fifth ranking title of the season and the 22nd of his professional career. In addition to the winner's prize of £50,000, Trump secured the £150,000 European Series bonus, awarded to the player who wins the most prize money across the series, for a second consecutive season.

The event featured the return to the professional tour of seven-time world champion Stephen Hendry, who retired in 2012, but accepted a two-year invitational tour card to begin in the 2020–21 season. Matthew Selt beat Hendry 4–1 in the first round of the tournament.

Prize fund
The breakdown of the tournament's prize money is shown below:

 Winner: £50,000
 Runner-up: £20,000
 Semi-final: £6,000
 Quarter-final: £5,000
 Last 16: £4,000
 Last 32: £3,000
 Last 64: £2,000
 Highest break: £5,000
 Total: £251,000

Tournament draw
Below is the full draw for the event. Players in bold denote match winners.

Top half

Section 1

Section 2

Section 3

Section 4

Bottom half

Section 5

Section 6

Section 7

Section 8

Finals

Final

Century breaks
A total of 80 century breaks were made during the tournament.

 145, 103  Jamie Jones
 142, 137, 130, 124  Mark Selby
 140, 113  Shaun Murphy
 140  Scott Donaldson
 138  Riley Parsons
 137, 126, 103  Jack Lisowski
 137  Chris Wakelin
 134, 114  Jamie Clarke
 132, 115  Fraser Patrick
 132, 105  Chen Zifan
 131, 128, 126, 124, 124, 106, 104, 101  Judd Trump
 130, 129, 103  Barry Hawkins
 127, 115, 107  Stuart Carrington
 126  Mark Allen
 125  Mitchell Mann
 124, 107  David Gilbert
 124  Luo Honghao
 123, 102  Soheil Vahedi
 121, 115, 113, 109, 101  Xiao Guodong
 119, 102  Matthew Selt
 119  Thepchaiya Un-Nooh
 118  Anthony McGill
 116  Ashley Hugill
 116  Elliot Slessor
 115, 109, 105  Kyren Wilson
 113  Anthony Hamilton
 112, 100  Luca Brecel
 109, 106  Liam Highfield
 108  Ricky Walden
 107, 105, 100  Ali Carter
 107  Stephen Hendry
 107  Lu Ning
 106, 102  Liang Wenbo
 105  Hossein Vafaei
 104  Tom Ford
 104  Pang Junxu
 103  Oliver Lines
 103  Mark Williams
 102  Billy Castle
 101, 101  Jamie O'Neill
 101  Chang Bingyu
 101  Si Jiahui
 100  Martin Gould
 100  Sunny Akani

References

2021
Gibraltar Open
Gibraltar Open
Snooker competitions in England
Gibraltar Open
Sport in Milton Keynes